JWH-138 (THC-Octyl, Δ8-THC-C8)  is a synthetic cannabinoid first synthesised by John W. Huffman, with a Ki of 8.5nM at the CB1 cannabinoid receptor.

Isomers

The Δ3/Δ6a(10a) isomer was synthesised in 1941, but was found to be slightly less active than Δ3-THC itself.  The alternate isomer Δ9-THC-C8 has also been synthesised, but has not been identified as a natural product.

See also 
 Cannabicyclohexanol
 Parahexyl
 Tetrahydrocannabihexol
 THCP

References 

Xanthenes